Trans Ganga City is an under construction satellite township in Indian state of Uttar Pradesh in Unnao district which comes under Kanpur metropolitan area. The area comprises stretch from the limits of Unnao Municipality to Ganga river near Kanpur on NH 25 and Unnao-Shuklaganj Highway. The Government of Uttar Pradesh has also proposed Skill Development University near the proposed Hi-tech city.

References

Unnao
Cities and towns in Unnao district
Proposed infrastructure in Uttar Pradesh
Economy of Uttar Pradesh
Science and technology in Uttar Pradesh
Financial districts in India
Buildings and structures under construction in India
Planned cities in India
Financial services in India